Inwood may refer to:

Places
In Canada:
Inwood, Manitoba
Inwood, Ontario

In the United Kingdom:
 Inwood, Warleigh, Wiltshire, England

In the United States:
 Inwood, Florida
Inwood, Indiana
 Inwood, Iowa
 Inwood, Manhattan, a neighborhood in Manhattan, New York City
 Inwood Hill Park
 Inwood – 207th Street (IND Eighth Avenue Line), a New York City Subway station serving the A train
 Inwood, Mississippi, a ghost town
 Inwood, New York, in Nassau County
 Inwood (LIRR station), a Long Island Rail Road station
 Inwood Country Club
 Inwood, Maryland
 Inwood, Michigan, ghost town
 Inwood, San Antonio, a district of the city of San Antonio, Texas
 Inwood, West Virginia
 Inwood Forest, Houston, Texas
 Inwood Township, Michigan

Other uses
 Inwood (surname)